Guitar is a 1988 live album by Frank Zappa. It is the follow-up to 1981's Shut Up 'n Play Yer Guitar; like that album it features Zappa's guitar solos excerpted from live performances, recorded between 1979 and 1984. It garnered Zappa his sixth Grammy nomination for "Best Rock Instrumental Performance".

Background 
Guitar was originally intended to be a 3-record box set (like Shut Up 'n Play Yer Guitar), but Zappa decided, with this release, to start using compact discs as his primary distribution medium rather than records.  As such, it was Zappa's first album to be released simultaneously on vinyl and CD.  The double CD, released on Rykodisc in the US and Zappa Records in Europe, contained all 32 tracks while the double LP was pared down to 19 tracks and released on Zappa's Barking Pumpkin label (US) and Zappa Records (EU).

Aside from "Watermelon in Easter Hay", "Sexual Harassment In The Workplace" and "Outside Now," all tracks were derived from performances of other songs, as on Shut Up 'n Play Your Guitar. Other solos were excerpted from "The Black Page", "Let's Move to Cleveland", "Drowning Witch", "Zoot Allures", "Whipping Post", "City of Tiny Lites", "Advance Romance", "Hot-Plate Heaven at the Green Hotel", "King Kong", "Easy Meat", "Ride My Face to Chicago", "Sharleena", "A Pound for a Brown on the Bus", and "Inca Roads".

Track names, though unrelated to the actual compositions, make many references to popular culture and world history. "Do Not Pass Go" refers to the Monopoly phrase that appears to prevent players from collecting a monetary bonus; "Jim & Tammy's Upper Room" recalls televangelists Jim Bakker and his wife Tammy Faye Messner; "Were We Ever Really Safe in San Antonio?", "Sunrise Redeemer" and "Hotel Atlanta Incidentals" are references to the locations of the venues in which the pieces were played; "Move It or Park It" is a colloquialism that could express frustration with an apprehensive driver of a motor vehicle; "Orrin Hatch on Skis" refers to Utah Republican Senator Orrin Hatch; "But Who Was Fulcanelli?" refers to an alias apparently used by a 19th-century French alchemist and author; "For Duane", one of Zappa's many readings of "Whipping Post", references Duane Allman; "GOA" is titled after the region of India; "Do Not Try This at Home" refers to the disclaimer often associated with dangerous or risky feats on television or video.

"Chalk Pie" was Zappa's planned title for a 1982 release of which its tracks eventually appeared on Ship Arriving Too Late to Save a Drowning Witch and The Man from Utopia.

"In-A-Gadda-Stravinsky" refers both to Iron Butterfly's "In-A-Gadda-Da-Vida" and 20th-century composer Igor Stravinsky, one of Zappa's influences. During the piece, bassist Scott Thunes plays the well-known motif from "In-A-Gadda-Da-Vida", while Zappa plays a line from Stravinsky's The Rite of Spring. "Taps" is also quoted by Thunes.

"Variations on Sinister #3", though derived from a version of "Easy Meat", gained its name from the interpolation of themes from "Theme from the 3rd Movement of Sinister Footwear" from You Are What You Is.

"Canadian Customs" almost certainly refers to the Canada Border Services Agency. Zappa is said to have experienced problems with the CBSA and created a routine around them with Napoleon Murphy Brock and André Lewis circa 1975.

"It Ain't Necessarily the Saint James Infirmary" is a portmanteau of "It Ain't Necessarily So", written by George and Ira Gershwin with libretto by DuBose Heyward for Porgy and Bess and "St. James Infirmary Blues", a composition with no officially recorded writer, famously recorded by Louis Armstrong and later by Cab Calloway. Guitar credits the latter to Joe Primrose, but the song's author is unverified. Both songs are quoted on the track.

The Real Frank Zappa Book, Zappa's autobiography, contains the following statement, which most likely accounts for the track name "Winos Do Not March":

Longer edits of "But Who Was Fulcanelli?" and "For Duane" and a shorter edit of "Things That Look Like Meat" appear on the 1987 compilation The Guitar World According to Frank Zappa. One of its tracks, "A Solo from Heidelberg", derived from "Yo' Mama", was originally intended to appear on Guitar.

Similar albums are Shut Up 'n Play Yer Guitar, Trance-Fusion, Frank Zappa Plays the Music of Frank Zappa: A Memorial Tribute, The Guitar World According to Frank Zappa.

Track listing
All tracks composed by Frank Zappa, except where noted.

Vinyl version

Personnel

 Frank Zappa - guitar (all tracks)
 Ray White - guitar (all tracks except 10, 26)
 Ike Willis - guitar (tracks 3, 6, 7, 9, 12, 14, 17-19, 21-23, 29, 30)
 Steve Vai - guitar (tracks 1, 2, 4, 5, 8, 11, 13, 15, 16, 20, 24, 25, 27, 28, 31, 32)
 Denny Walley - guitar (tracks 10, 26)
 Warren Cuccurullo - guitar (tracks 10, 26)
 Tommy Mars - keyboards (tracks 1, 2, 4, 5, 8, 10, 11, 13, 15, 16, 20, 24-27, 31, 32)
 Bobby Martin- keyboards (all tracks except 10, 26)
 Peter Wolf - keyboards (tracks 10, 26)
 Allan Zavod - keyboards (tracks 3, 6, 7, 9, 12, 14, 17-19, 21-23, 29, 30)
 Scott Thunes - bass guitar (all tracks except 10, 26)
 Arthur Barrow - bass guitar (tracks 10, 26)
 Ed Mann - percussion (tracks 1, 2, 4, 5, 8, 10, 11, 13, 15, 16, 20, 24-28, 31, 32)
 Chad Wackerman - drums (all tracks except 10, 26)
 Vinnie Colaiuta - drums (tracks 10, 26)

See also
Goa (disambiguation)

References

External links
Album information
Release details

1988 live albums
Albums produced by Frank Zappa
Barking Pumpkin Records albums
Frank Zappa live albums